Paranemoura is a genus of spring stoneflies in the family Nemouridae. There are at least two described species in Paranemoura.

Species
These two species belong to the genus Paranemoura:
 Paranemoura claasseni Baumann, 1996
 Paranemoura perfecta (Walker, 1852) (spotted forestfly)

References

Further reading

 
 

Nemouridae
Articles created by Qbugbot